Integrin, alpha L (antigen CD11A (p180), lymphocyte function-associated antigen 1; alpha polypeptide), also known as ITGAL, is a protein that in human is encoded by ITGAL gene. CD11a functions in the immune system. It is involved in cellular adhesion and costimulatory signaling. It is the target of the drug efalizumab.

Function 

ITGAL gene encodes the integrin alpha L chain. Integrins are heterodimeric integral membrane proteins composed of an alpha chain and a beta chain. This I-domain containing alpha integrin combines with the beta 2 chain (ITGB2) to form the integrin lymphocyte function-associated antigen-1 (LFA-1), which is expressed on all leukocytes. LFA-1 plays a central role in leukocyte intercellular adhesion through interactions with its ligands, ICAMs 1-3 (intercellular adhesion molecules 1 through 3), and also functions in lymphocyte costimulatory signaling.

CD11a is one of the two components, along with CD18, which form lymphocyte function-associated antigen-1.

Efalizumab acts as an immunosuppressant by binding to CD11a but was withdrawn in 2009 because it was associated with severe side effects.

Interactions 

CD11a has been shown to interact with ICAM-1.

See also 
 CD11c
 integrin
 leukocyte adhesion deficiency
 Cluster of differentiation

References

Further reading

External links 
 
ITGAL Info with links in the Cell Migration Gateway 
 

Integrins
Clusters of differentiation